This is a List of bishops and archbishops of Cambrai, that is, of the Roman Catholic Archdiocese of Cambrai.

Bishops 
For the first bishops of Arras and Cambrai, who resided at the former place, see Arras. On the death of Saint Vedulphus (545–580) the episcopal residence was transferred from Arras to Cambrai. Among his successors were:
 Saint Gaugericus (580–619)
 Saint Berthoaldus (about 625)
 Saint Aubert (d. 667)
 Saint Vindicianus (667–693), who brought King Theuderic III of the Franks to account for the murder of Saint Léger of Autun
 Saint Hadulfus (d. 728)
 Alberic and Hildoard, contemporaries of Charlemagne, who gave to the diocese a sacramentary and important canons
 Halitgar (Halitgarius, Halitgaire) (817–831), an ecclesiastical writer and apostle of the Danes
 Saint John of Cambrai (866–879)
 Saint Rothadus (879–886)
 Fulbert (934–956), defended Cambrai from the Magyars and became the first bishop with comital authority in the city
 Wiboldus (965–966), author of the ludus secularis which "furnished amusement to clerkly persons"
 Erluin (995–1012), first bishop who was also count of the Cambrésis, feuded with Count Baldwin IV of Flanders
 Gerard of Florennes (1013–1051), formerly chaplain to Henry II, Holy Roman Emperor, and helpful to the latter in his negotiations with Robert the Pious, King of France (Gerard also converted by persuasion the Gondulphian heretics, who denied the Eucharist)
 Lietbertus (1057–1076), who defended Cambrai against Robert the Frisian
 Gerard II (1076–1092), introduced the Gregorian reform to Cambrai; last bishop to also be bishop of Arras
 Manasses of Soissons (1095–1103)
 Odo (1105–1113), celebrated as a professor and director of the school of Tournai, also as a writer and founder of the monastery of St. Martin near Tournai
 Burchard of Cambrai (1115–1131), who sent Norbert of Xanten and the Premonstratensians to Antwerp to combat the heresy of Tanchelm's disciples concerning the Eucharist
 Lietard (1131–1134)
 Nicolas I de Chièvres (1137–1167)
 Pierre I de Flandre ou d'Alsace (1167–1173), never consecrated
 Robert d'Aire (1173–1174), never consecrated
 Alard (1175–1178), never consecrated
 Roger de Wavrin (1179–1191)
 Jean II d'Antoing (1192–1196)
 Nicolas II du Roeulx (1197)
 Hugh (1197–1198), never consecrated
 Pierre II de Corbeil (1199–1200)
 John of Béthune (1200–1219)
 Godefroid de Fontaines (1220–1237/1238)
 Guiard of Laon (1238–1248)
 Ingeramus de Crequy (1274–1286)
 Guillaume de Hainault (1286–1296),
 Gui de Collemedio (1296–1306)
 Philip Leportier de Marigny (1306-1309)
 Pierre de Lévis de Mirepoix (1309-1324)
 Gui de Arvernia (Bologne) (1324-1336)
 Guillaume d’Auxonne (1336-1342)
 Guy de Ventadour (1342-1349)
 Pierre d’André (1348-1368)
 Robert II of Geneva (1368–1371)
 Gerard III (1371–1378), previously bishop of Arras and Thérouanne
 Jean t'Serclaes (1378–1389) (appointed by Clement VII of the Avignon Obedience)
 André de Luxembourg (1390–1396)
 Pierre d'Ailly (1396–1411) (appointed by Benedict XIII of the Avignon Obedience)
 Jean de Gavre (1411–1439)
 John of Burgundy illegitimate son of Duke John the Fearless of Burgundy (1439–1479)
 Henry de Berghes (1480–1502)
 Jacques de Croÿ (1503–1516), son of Jean II de Croÿ 
 William de Croy, cardinal in 1517, apostolic administrator of Toledo in 1517 (1516–1519)
 Robert de Croÿ (1519–1556)
 Maximilian de Berghes (1556–1562)

Archbishops 

 Maximilian de Berghes (1562–1570)
 Louis de Berlaymont (1570–1596)
 Jean Sarazin (1596–1598)
 Guillaume de Berghes (1601–1609)
 Jean Richardot (1609–1614), minister and diplomat of the Archdukes Albert and Isabella.
 François Buisseret (1614–1615)
 Franciscus van der Burch (1616–1644)
 Joseph de Bergaigne (1644–1647)
 Gaspard Nemius (1649–1667)
 Ladislas Jonart (1667–1674)
 Jacques-Théodore de Bryas (1675–1694)
 François de Salignac de La Mothe-Fénelon, theologian and writer, proponent of Quietism (1695–1715).
 Jean d' Estrées (1716–1718)
 Cardinal Joseph de la Tremoille (1718–1720).
  Cardinal Guillaume Dubois (1720–1723), minister to Louis XV.
 Charles de Saint-Albin (1723–1764) (illegitimate son of Philippe d' Orleans, Regent of France)
 Leopold-Charles de Choiseul-Stainville (1764–1774) (His brother, Étienne-François, was Foreign Minister)
 Henri-Marie-Bernardin de Ceilhes de Rosset de Fleury (1774–1781)
 Ferdinand Maximilien Mériadec de Rohan (1781–1801).
Louis de Belmas (30 April 1802 – 21 July 1841)
 Pierre Giraud (24 January 1842 – 17 April 1850)
 René-François Régnier (30 September 1850 – 3 January 1881) 
 Alfred Duquesnay (1881–1884).
 François-Edouard Hasley (27 March 1885 – 7 August 1888)
 Odon Thibaudier (14 February 1889 – 9 January 1892)
 Etienne-Marie-Alphonse Sonnois (19 January 1893 – 7 February 1913)
 François-Marie-Joseph Delamaire (7 February 1913 – 21 July 1913)
 Jean-Arthur Chollet (21 November 1913 – 2 December 1952)
 Emile Maurice Guerry (2 December 1952 – 15 February 1966 Retired)
 Henri-Martin-Félix Jenny (15 February 1966 – 25 March 1980 Retired)
 Jacques Louis Léon Delaporte (25 March 1980 – 21 November 1999) 
 François Garnier (7 December 2000 – 15 August 2018)
 Vincent Dollmann (15 August 2018 –)

References

Bibliography

Reference works
  p. 160. (in Latin)
 pp. 115–116.
 p. 100.
 p. 139.

Studies